The men's 4 x 400 metres relay at the 1934 European Athletics Championships was held in Turin, Italy, at the  Stadio Benito Mussolini on 9 September 1934.

Medalists

Results

Final
9 September

Participation
According to an unofficial count, 16 athletes from 4 countries participated in the event.

 (4)
 (4)
 (4)
 (4)

References

4 x 400 metres relay
4 x 400 metres relay at the European Athletics Championships